Evans Odhiambo Kidero (born 20 May 1957) is a Kenyan politician and former Governor of Nairobi County. He served as CEO of Mumias Sugar Company for 8 years, resigning in 2012 to join elective politics.

Early life
Kidero was born in Majengo as the eldest in a family of 7. He did his O level at Agoro Sare High School then for his A level, attended Mangu High School where he eventually became Head Boy, also known as prefect. He graduated from the University of Nairobi in 1983 with a Degree in Pharmacy and went on to obtain a Masters in Business Administration at the Kenyan United States International University in 1990. 
He was CEO of the Mumias Sugar Company for eight years before resigning from that position in 2012 to pursue a career in politics.

Political career
Kidero was elected as the first governor of Nairobi County in the Nairobi gubernatorial elections of 2013 on an ODM ticket.

Following a petition by Ferdinand Waititu, who ran against him in the gubernatorial election, Kidero was ousted as Nairobi Governor, with the court citing electoral malpractices. Kidero was later reinstated by the Supreme Court following an appeal that overturned the decision of the Court of Appeal.  In 2017 elections, Evans Kidero lost to  Mike Sonko in the Nairobi gubernatorial election.

Dr. Kidero is married to Susan Mboya, daughter of the late Kenyan politician, Tom Mboya. He has three children from a previous marriage to the late Abigail Odhiambo Kidero.

Graft Charges And Arrest 
In August 2018 Evans was arrested on charges of abuse of office, money laundering and bribery.  In October 2018, it was further revealed the Ethics and Anti-Corruption Commission was investigating him for alleged embezzlement of public funds while at the helm of the Nairobi County and the Mumias Sugar Company Limited. According to Kenya’s Ethics and Anti-Corruption Commission’s investigations, Kidero’s worth is Sh9 billion in terms of assets.

See also
 Timeline of Nairobi

References

External links

 

1957 births
Living people
Orange Democratic Movement politicians
County Governors of Kenya
University of Nairobi alumni
People from Nairobi